Miss Teen Diva 2020 was the inaugural edition of Miss Teen Diva beauty pageant. It was held on January 25, 2021 at Kingdom of Dreams in Gurugram, India. The event was hosted by Simran Ahuja. At the conclusion of the event, Rashi Parasrampuria was crowned Miss Teen India International 2020 by outgoing titleholder, Aayushi Dholakia from Gujarat. At the same event, Wachi Pareek was crowned Miss Teen India Universe 2020, Aishwarya Vinu was crowned Miss Teen India Earth 2020 and Sayali Ayre was crowned Miss Teen India Multinational 2020. Along with that, two runners-up, Pranjal Priya and Sejal Kumar.

Results
Below are the names of the placement holders of Miss Teen Diva 2020 beauty pageant.

Judges
Below are the names of the people who were part of the judging panel.
 Nikhil Anand - Chairman and founder of Glamanand Group.
 Rajiv K Shrivastava - Director of Glamanand Group, President, Act Now, an NGO for environmental awareness, sustainability and peace 
 Pushkar Malik - Managing director of MSV International.
 Kartikya Arora - Editor in chief of TMM magazine. 
 Dr. Varun Katyal - Nutritionist and wellness expert
 Rekha Vohra - Holistic healer and motivational speaker 
 Yogesh Mishra - Director of Fusion Group 
 Preeti Seth - Founder of Pachouli Wellness Clinic.

Candidates
Below are the names of the national finalist.
 Aishwarya Vinu Nair 
 Astha Dave
 Bhoomika Sahu
 Chetna Aroa 
 Debapriya Sharma
 Divya Chaudhary
 Gargi Yadav
 Guramrit Kaur
 Kannkshi Rathi 
 Maahi Nikam
 Manishika Goel
Melissa Nayak
 Parvi Dhaulakhandi
 Pranjal Priya
 Priyal Bhatt
 Rashi Parasrampuria
 Ritu Gadhvi
 Riya Choudhary
 Rudrangi Sundaray
 Sejal Kumar
 Shivangi Desai
 Shrishti Xalxo
 Sayali Ayre
 Wachi Pareek 
 Yashika Dudeja

References

Beauty pageants in India
2020 beauty pageants